The 1949 Tour de Romandie was the third edition of the Tour de Romandie cycle race and was held from 12 May to 15 May 1949. The race started and finished in Geneva. The race was won by Gino Bartali.

General classification

References

1949
Tour de Romandie